Deepti Naval (born 3 February 1952) is an Indian-born American actress, director, and writer, predominantly active in Hindi cinema.

Her major contribution has been in the area of art cinema, winning critical acclaim for her sensitive and 'close to life' characters that emphasized the changing roles of women in India.

Early life
Naval was born on 3 February 1952 in Amritsar, East Punjab, India, but moved to New York City when her father got a teaching job at City University of New York. She studied fine arts at Hunter College.

Acting career

Naval made her debut in 1978 with Shyam Benegal's film Junoon. Two years later, she played a lead role in Ek Baar Phir. Alongside Smita Patil and Shabana Azmi, she became an actress in 1980s Parallel cinema, playing roles in films like Kamla (1984) or Ankahee (1985).

Starting with Chashme Buddoor in 1981, she was often cast with Farooq Sheikh and they became an iconic on-screen couple of the early 1980s, with films such as Chashme Buddoor,  Saath Saath, Kissi Se Na Kehna, Katha, Rang Birangi and Faasle. Three decades later, they reunited in Tell Me O Kkhuda (2011). Their last film together was Listen... Amaya which was released in 2013, the year Shaikh died.

While she was very prolific in the 1980s, her career slowed down in the 1990s and she explored other art forms. She came back in the 2000s with social dramas like Bawandar and Firaaq, and won Best Actress awards in several international film festivals for her roles in Leela (2002), Memories in March (2010) and Listen... Amaya (2013). She was also recognized as the 2007 Tribute Honoree of the Indian Film Festival of Los Angeles.

Mostly present in Hindi cinema, Naval also acted in other Indian languages, as with Marhi Da Deeva and Mane, which respectively won the award for Best Feature Film in Punjabi and Best Feature Film in Kannada at the 1990 National Film Awards ceremony. She was to make her debut in a Bengali movie under director Sanjoy Nag but the film - Memories in March - was eventually shot in English.

Naval has been active on TV with a few telefilms and serials such as Sauda (1992), Tanaav (1994) or Muqammal (2003). She came back in 2011 with the daily soap opera Mukti Bandhan on Colors TV. She made her theater debut in 2015 with the poetic stage show Ek Mulaqaat in which she played the celebrated Punjabi writer Amrita Pritam.

In 2019, Naval appeared in an episode of Made in Heaven, a web series on Amazon Prime directed by Zoya Akhtar.

Other work
Naval made her directorial debut with Do Paise Ki Dhoop, Chaar Aane Ki Baarish starring Manisha Koirala and Rajit Kapur. The film won the Best Screenplay Award at the 2009 New York Indian Film Festival which released on Netflix in 2019. She also wrote and directed Thoda Sa Aasmaan, a TV serial centred around strong female characters, and produced a travel show, The Path Less Travelled.

Her first selection of poems in Hindi, Lamha Lamha was published in 1983. In 2004, MapinLit published a new collection called Black Wind and Other Poems. Naval is also the author of a collection of short stories, The Mad Tibetan, published in 2011.

Naval is also a painter and photographer with several exhibitions to her credit. Her works as a painter include the controversial Pregnant Nun. She also runs the Vinod Pandit Charitable Trust, set up in memory of her late companion, for the education of the girl child.

Personal life
Naval was married to the filmmaker Prakash Jha and the two have an adopted daughter, Disha Jha. Naval was later in a relationship with the late Vinod Pandit, the nephew of Pandit Jasraj. , she is an American citizen.

She is also interested in painting and photography.

Awards
 1988, Bengal Film Journalists' Association Awards, Best Supporting Actress, Mirch Masala
 2003, Best Supporting Actress Award at the Karachi Film Festival
 2012, Best Actress Award at the Imagine India Film Festival (Spain)
 2013, Best Actress Award at the New York Indian Film Festival

Filmography

Films

Television

References

External links

 
 
 

1952 births
Living people
Actresses from Amritsar
Indian film actresses
Indian television actresses
Indian emigrants to the United States
American film actresses
American television actresses
American people of Punjabi descent
American actresses of Indian descent
American expatriate actresses in India
Actresses in Hindi cinema
Actresses in Punjabi cinema
Actresses in Kannada cinema
Actresses in Marathi cinema
Hunter College alumni
Artist authors
21st-century Indian women
21st-century American women
21st-century American actresses